Afro-American Work Songs in a Texas Prison is a 1966 American film directed by Toshi Seeger, a specialist in films focusing on folk music. The film explores inmates in the U.S. state of Texas as they chop down trees while singing songs derived from those used by African American slaves, such as field hollers.

Afro-American Work Songs in a Texas Prison has been archived and preserved by the Library of Congress.

The complete film is streaming on Folkstreams.

See also
List of American films of 1966

References

1966 films
1960s English-language films
African-American films
1966 documentary films
Documentary films about music and musicians
Documentary films about African Americans
Documentary films about incarceration in the United States
Films shot in Texas
American short documentary films
African-American history of Texas
1960s American films